The (R)evolution of Steve Jobs is an opera with music by American composer Mason Bates and an English-language libretto by Mark Campbell. It was commissioned by Santa Fe Opera, Seattle Opera, San Francisco Opera, the Jacobs School of Music at Indiana University, with support from Cal Performances. The opera is about one of the most influential people in recent history; it is set at a time when he must confront his own mortality and circle back on the events that shaped his personal and professional life.

Performance history
The world premiere took place at the Santa Fe Opera in 2017, conducted by Michael Christie. The original production featured direction by Kevin Newbury, scenic design by Vita Tzykun, costume design by Paul Carey, lighting design by Japhy Weideman, projection design by Ben Pearcy for 59 Productions, and sound design by Rick Jacobsohn and Brian Losch; it was a co-production of Santa Fe Opera, Seattle Opera, San Francisco Opera, and the Indiana University Jacobs School of Music. The (R)evolution of Steve Jobs was the most popular new opera in Santa Fe Opera's history and one of the top-selling operas in the company's history. An extra performance had to be added to accommodate the demand for tickets. In May 2018, a recording of the work was issued under the Pentatone label; Bates and Campbell received Grammy Award nominations for Best Contemporary Classical Composition, engineers Mark Donahue and Dirk Sobotka were nominated for Best Engineered Album (Classical), and Elizabeth Ostrow was nominated for Producer of the Year (Classical). The recording won the 2019 Grammy for Best Opera Recording (honoring conductor Michael Christie, producer Elizabeth Ostrow, and principal soloists Sasha Cooke, Jessica E. Jones, Edward Parks, Garrett Sorenson, and Wei Wu).

Bates was drawn to Steve Jobs as the subject for an opera, because, he says, opera “can illuminate the interior thoughts of different characters simultaneously through the juxtaposition of individual themes. That makes it an ideal medium to explore a man who revolutionized how we communicate.” Bates asked Mark Campbell, one of America's leading opera librettists, to create the story in the libretto. According to Campbell, “Learning that Jobs was a Buddhist his entire adult life lead me to the ensō, the circle that is drawn in Japanese calligraphy to express enlightenment. I connected that with Jobs’ habit of taking long walks and the Zen practice of pacing in a circular pattern called a kinhin and began to develop a story in which Steve ‘circles back’ on his life. The title actually refers less to the revolution Jobs helped create in technology rather than the kinhin of self-reflection that propels the story.”  Gary Rydstrom of Skywalker Sound assisted Bates with the production of the opera’s electronic sounds.

There have been two other presentations of the original Santa Fe production, with a third planned in 2020 and a fourth in 2021.

 Indiana University's Jacobs School of Music presented four performances of the opera in 2018 in their Musical Arts Center. Michael Christie conducted a student cast.
 Seattle Opera presented the opera in McCaw Hall, with seven performances in February and March 2019. Garrett Sorenson reprised the role of "Woz", and Nicole Paiement conducting in her Seattle Opera debut.
 San Francisco Opera will present the opera in War Memorial Opera House for a run of seven performances in June and July 2020. Edward Parks, Sasha Cooke, Garrett Sorenson, and Wei Wu are scheduled to reprise their roles from the Santa Fe run, with Michael Christie returning as conductor.
 A production at the Lyric Opera of Kansas City was scheduled for Spring 2021 but was postponed due to the COVID-19 pandemic. Three performances for the Lyric Opera of Kansas City were performed at the Kauffman Center in March 2022.
 Atlanta Opera had four performances at the Cobb Energy Center between April 30 and May 8, 2022. 

 Calgary Opera has three performances scheduled for February 2023. 

 Utah Opera has five performances scheduled for May 2023.

Roles

Synopsis

This one-act opera features roles based on real-life figures Steve Jobs, Steve Wozniak, Chrisann Brennan, Kōbun Chino Otogawa, and Laurene Powell. Inspired by the life and creative spirit of Steve Jobs, the opera does not purport to depict actual events as they occurred or statements, beliefs, or opinions of the persons depicted.

Discography 
 Parks, Cooke, Wu, Sorenson; Christie, 2017 (Pentatone (record label)) - Grammy Award Winner, Best Opera Recording

Sources

External links
 Musical highlights, Seattle Opera, soundcloud.com

2017 operas
Cultural depictions of Steve Jobs
English-language operas
Operas
Operas based on real people
Operas set in the 20th century
Operas set in the United States
Operas set in the 21st century
Compositions by Mason Bates